Clan Galbraith was a steel barque built in Port Glasgow, Scotland in 1894 for trade with Calcutta.

On 22 July 1916, returning in ballast from Bristol, England after delivering oil there, Clan Galbraith ran aground at Flying Point beach, near Bridgehampton, New York, while attempting to find her way to the Ambrose Channel lightship in a heavy fog. Her distress signals were responded to by life savers from the communities of Bridgehampton and Southampton. A breeches buoy was put up by the life savers for the safety, in the event of a storm, of those crew members who, along with Captain A. E. Olson, elected to stay aboard. The United States Coast Guard cutter , as well as two wrecking tugs, was sent to aid the stricken vessel.

Among the crowds that gathered to view the shipwreck was Republican Presidential candidate Charles Evans Hughes, along with his family.

In World War I Clan Galbraith was stopped and scuttled off the coast of Ireland by the German submarine  while sailing from Philadelphia, PA to Birkenhead with a cargo of lubricating oil and wax.  There were no casualties.

References

1894 ships
Barques
Ships built on the River Clyde
Ships sunk by German submarines in World War I